Hesse Peak is, at , the highest peak on Paryadin Ridge, lying midway between Cape Alexandra and Cape Paryadin at the west end of South Georgia. It was charted and named by a German expedition under Kohl-Larsen in 1928–29.

References

Mountains and hills of South Georgia